Calumet is a town in Canadian County, Oklahoma, United States. It is part of the Oklahoma City Metropolitan Area.  The population was 507 at the 2010 census, a 5.23 percent decrease since 2000.

Calumet is a variant term for Ceremonial pipe. Incorporated in 1942, the town's land was settled in the Land Run of 1892.

History
Calumet incorporated in 1942 in order to construct a town water system.  Prior to its incorporation, the town existed as an unincorporated community with a post office, three combination mills and elevators, two general stores, a furniture store, and a hardware store.

The town lies in an area that in 1803 was part of the Louisiana Purchase.  After the Organic Act of 1890 recreated the area as Oklahoma Territory, present-day Canadian County was designated as County Four and settled by non-Indian settlers through the Land Run of 1889, the Land Run of 1892, and a 1901 land lottery.  The Land Run of 1892 opened up the surplus Cheyenne-Arapaho lands to non-Indian settlement, which opened up Calumet.

Geography
Calumet is located on US Route 270 in northwestern Canadian County, 11 miles northwest of El Reno and 11 miles east of Geary and 1.5 miles south of the North Canadian River. It is on the border of the Red Bed Plains and Gypsum Hills ecoregions of Oklahoma.

Climate

Demographics

As of the 2010 United States Census, there were 507 people, 187 households, and 130 families residing in the town. The racial makeup of the town was 78.9% white, 13.6% Native American, 0.4% Asian, 2.4% from other races, and 4.7% from two or more races. Hispanics or Latinos were 4% of the population.

There were 187 households, out of which 40.6% had children under the age of 18 living with them, 69.5% were married couples living together, 9.6% had a female householder with no husband present, and 30.5% were non-families.  Less than a third of households (28.9%) were made up of individuals, and 13.4% had someone living alone who was 65 years of age or older.  The average household size was 2.71 and the average family size was 3.28.

In the town, the population was spread out, with 29.6% under the age of 18, 8.4% from 18 to 24, 25.4% from 25 to 44, 24% from 45 to 64, and 12.6% who were 65 years of age or older.  The median age was 36.2 years.  For every 100 females, there were 91.3 males.  For every 100 females age 18 and over, there were X males.

The median income for a household in the town was $50,625, (compared to a national median income of $52,762) and the median income for a family was $56,607.  Males had a median income of $46,786 versus $26,875 for females.  The per capita income for the town was $27,113.  An estimated 8% of families and 9.5% of the population were below the poverty line, including 12.6% of those under age 18.

Education
Calumet contains three schools housed in two separate buildings: an elementary school, a junior high, and a high school.  A fourth school, Maple Public School, is separate from the Calumet school district.

References

External links
 Encyclopedia of Oklahoma History and Culture - Calumet

Oklahoma City metropolitan area
Towns in Canadian County, Oklahoma
Towns in Oklahoma